The USSR Men's Handball Cup in ( Russian : Кубок СССР по гандболу среди мужчин ) was a competition of the USSR men's handball teams, and it was considered the second competition after the Soviet Men's Handball Championship.

Winners list

Winners by club

References

External links
 rushandball.ru

Handball competitions in the Soviet Union
Handball in the Soviet Union